Thomas Rymer Jones, FRS (1810 – 10 October 1880) was an English surgeon, academic and zoologist.

Life
The son of a captain in the Royal Navy, he studied at Guy's Hospital and in Paris. He became M.R.C.S. in 1833, but found himself unable to practice because of hearing impairment.

Jones was appointed the first professor of comparative anatomy at King's College London, in 1836, and was Fullerian Professor of Physiology at the Royal Institution in 1840 to 1842. In 1838, at the meeting of the British Association at Newcastle, he was the sole opponent of Christian Gottfried Ehrenberg, who maintained the polygastric nature of certain infusoria.

Jones was elected a Fellow of the Royal Society. He died in London on 10 December 1880, having resigned his professorship in 1874.

Works
Jones's General Outline of the Animal Kingdom, and Manual of Comparative Anatomy, London, was published with woodcuts, 1838–41. It became a standard textbook. He wrote articles on comparative anatomy for Robert Bentley Todd's Cyclopædia of Anatomy and Physiology, and popular works on zoology. Jones wrote papers in scientific journals and:

 ‘The Natural History of Animals (Invertebrates only), being the substance of three Courses of Lectures as Fullerian Professor,’ London, 1845–52.
 ‘The Aquarian Naturalist, a Manual for the Seaside,’ London, 1858 
 ‘The Animal Creation; a popular introduction to Zoology,’ London, 1865.
 ‘The Natural History of Birds, a popular introduction to Ornithology,’ London, 1867.
 ‘Mammalia: a popular introduction to Natural History,’ London, 1873.

He also edited William Kirby's Bridgewater Treatise, for Henry Bohn's series, in 1852; and a translation of the section Birds in Brehms Tierleben, issued as Cassell's Book of Birds in 1869–73.

References

External links
 

1810 births
1880 deaths
English surgeons
English zoologists
Fellows of the Royal Society
Fullerian Professors of Physiology
Academics of King's College London